Preben Blach (15 December 1920 – 28 March 2007) was a Danish field hockey player. He competed in the men's tournament at the 1948 Summer Olympics.

References

External links
 

1920 births
2007 deaths
Danish male field hockey players
Olympic field hockey players of Denmark
Field hockey players at the 1948 Summer Olympics
Sportspeople from Frederiksberg